Tommy Taylor (born 11 November 1991 in Macclesfield, England) is a rugby union player for Sale Sharks in the Gallagher Premiership. He plays as a hooker.

Taylor was selected for the England squad to face the Barbarians in the summer of 2014.

He was called up to England's 2016 Six Nations Championship squad on 13 March 2016 as injury cover for Jamie George. Taylor made his England debut as a replacement against Wales on 29 May 2016.

In February 2021, it was confirmed that he would rejoin Sale Sharks ahead of the 2021–22 season.

References

1991 births
Living people
English rugby union players
Rugby union hookers
Sale Sharks players
England international rugby union players
Rugby union players from Macclesfield
Wasps RFC players